Darawank is a small village area located approximately 10 km north of Forster and Tuncurry along the Lakes Way Road towards Taree where the road meets the Wallamba River.

Darawank is Aboriginal for "Dark Waters".

References

Suburbs of Mid-Coast Council